Anzhou or An Prefecture was a zhou (prefecture) in imperial China, centering on modern Anlu, Hubei, China. It existed (intermittently) from 550 until 1119, when the Song dynasty renamed it De'an Prefecture.

Geography
The administrative region of An Prefecture in the Tang dynasty was in modern central Hubei. It probably includes parts of modern: 
Under the administration of Xiaogan:
Xiaogan
Anlu
Yingcheng
Yunmeng County
Xiaochang County
Under the administration of Suizhou:
Guangshui

See also
Anlu Commandery
De'an Prefecture

References
 

Prefectures of the Sui dynasty
Prefectures of the Tang dynasty
Prefectures of Later Tang
Prefectures of Later Jin (Five Dynasties)
Prefectures of Later Han (Five Dynasties)
Prefectures of Later Liang (Five Dynasties)
Prefectures of Later Zhou
Prefectures of the Song dynasty
Former prefectures in Hubei